Fleur Jong (born 17 December 1995) is a Dutch Paralympic athlete. She won the gold medal in the women's long jump T64 event at the 2020 Summer Paralympics held in Tokyo, Japan. She also set a new world record of 6.16 metres. , her current world record in this event is 6.23 metres.

In June 2021, she won two gold medals by setting a new world record in both the women's 100 metres T64 and women's long jump T64 events at the World Para Athletics European Championships held in Bydgoszcz, Poland. In the long jump event, she set a new world record twice: in her fifth attempt, she jumped 6.04 metres and she improved this to 6.06 metres in her next attempt.

Early life 

A few days before her 17th birthday, in December 2012, she contracted a bacterial blood infection which hindered blood flow to her extremities. As a result, her right leg had to be amputated below the knee as well as part of her left foot and the top halves of eight fingers. Dutch para-snowboarder Bibian Mentel coached her during her rehabilitation. The following year, she also had her left leg amputated below the knee, at her request, as she was unable to use it properly.

In 2013, she attended a talent day for Paralympic sports organised by NOC*NSF where she met Guido Bonsen who later became her coach.

Career 

Early in her career, she competed as a T43-classified athlete. She won the bronze medal in the women's 200 metres T44 event at the 2015 IPC Athletics World Championships held in Doha, Qatar. She also finished in 6th place in the women's 100 metres T44 event. She represented the Netherlands in two events at the 2016 Summer Paralympics in Rio de Janeiro, Brazil. In both the women's 100 metres T44 and women's 200 metres T44 she did not advance to compete in the final. In 2017, she finished in 4th place in the women's 200 metres T44 event at the World Para Athletics Championships held in London, United Kingdom.

At the beginning of 2018, World Para Athletics implemented classification changes and, as of that year, she competes as a T62-classified athlete, a class specifically for athletes with double below the knee amputation. In 2019, she finished in 4th place in the women's long jump T64 event at the World Para Athletics Championships held in Dubai, United Arab Emirates. She also finished in 7th place in the women's 100 metres T64 event.

In May 2021, she became the first female T62-classified athlete to jump more than six metres in the long jump event. She set a new record of 6.02 metres at the 2021 World Para Athletics Grand Prix event held in Nottwil, Switzerland. In June 2021, she improved her world record to 6.06 metres at the World Para Athletics European Championships in Bydgoszcz, Poland. A week later, she improved her world record again to 6.09 metres at the annual Gouden Spike competition held in Leiden, Netherlands. She also won the 50th Gouden Spike award for her achievement.

She represented the Netherlands at the 2020 Summer Paralympics in Tokyo, Japan. She won the gold medal in the women's long jump T64 event with a new world record of 6.16 metres. She finished in 4th place in the women's 100 metres T64 event. She was also one of the flag bearers for the Netherlands during the opening ceremony of the 2020 Summer Paralympics.

In February 2022, she competed at the Dutch Indoor Athletics Championships among able-bodied athletes but without competing for a medal. In March, her portrait was added to a mural in the Schilderswijk neighbourhood of The Hague, Netherlands, alongside other Dutch competitors of the Summer or Winter Olympics and Paralympics held in 2021 and 2022. In May, she set a new world record of 6.23 metres in the women's long jump T62/F62 event at the L’Hospitalet International Meeting held in L'Hospitalet de Llobregat near Barcelona, Spain.

In June, she competed among able-bodied athletes at the 2022 FBK Games held in Hengelo, Netherlands. A few days later, she set a new T62 world record in the women's 100 metres T44/62/63/64 event at the World Para Athletics Grand Prix held in Paris, France. In July, she became the first woman with prosthetic legs to set a time of less than 12.50 seconds (T62 class) in the 100 metres event. She set the record at a competition held in Leverkusen, Germany.

Personal life 

She studies communication sciences at the University of Amsterdam.

Achievements

Track

Field

References

External links 

 

Living people
1995 births
Dutch female long jumpers
Dutch female sprinters
Dutch amputees
Athletes (track and field) at the 2016 Summer Paralympics
Athletes (track and field) at the 2020 Summer Paralympics
Medalists at the 2020 Summer Paralympics
Paralympic medalists in athletics (track and field)
Paralympic gold medalists for the Netherlands
Medalists at the World Para Athletics Championships
Medalists at the World Para Athletics European Championships
Paralympic athletes of the Netherlands
Long jumpers with limb difference
Female competitors in athletics with disabilities
People from Purmerend
Sportspeople from North Holland
Sprinters with limb difference
Paralympic sprinters
Paralympic long jumpers
21st-century Dutch women